Mushkil (Urdu: , lit. difficult) is an Urdu film which was released in 1995 across theaters in Pakistan. The film dealt with the issue of child-camel-jockeys illegally trafficked from the third world countries into numerous Arab countries. 

The super-hit film music was composed by Amjad Bobby. Hit tracks included Dil Ho Gaya Hai Tera Deewana and Mushkil Hai Bara Mushkil Hai. This film was directed by Javed Sheikh.

Cast
 Neeli
 Javed Sheikh
 Behroze Sabzwari
 Talish
 Asif Khan
 Meera
 Ghulam Mohiuddin (Guest appearance)
 Nadeem (Guest appearance)

Soundtrack 
The lyrics were written by Masroor Anwar and Saleem A. Saleem and music was composed by Amjad Bobby. 
 Dil Ho Gya Hay, Tera Deevana (Female version) sung by Mehnaz Begum
 Dil Ho Gya Hay, Tera Deevana (Male version) sung by Taskeen Javed
 Tujhko Bhool Kay Zinda Rehna, Mushkil Hai Bara Mushkil sung by Mehnaz Begum, Tehsin Javed

Awards
Nigar Award for Best Actor for Javed Sheikh in Mushkil (1995 film)

References

External links

Pakistani drama films
1990s Urdu-language films
1995 films
Films scored by Amjad Bobby
Nigar Award winners
Urdu-language Pakistani films